GrooveWorx (formerly known as Groove Addicts) is a custom music house that produces music for various categories of media. Based in Santa Monica, CA, GrooveWorx was founded by Dain Blair in 1996 as a custom music house for television commercials, scores for TV shows, feature film trailers and IDs for radio stations worldwide. One of its first projects was making station jingles for Capital Radio - London and BBC Radio 2. Over the next two years GrooveWorx quickly expanded into other areas of media by building a 60,000 track strong production library. In 1999, the company composed the music and sound design for Will Smith video for the 1999 film Wild Wild West, plus music and sound design for Michael Jackson's music videos. "History" and "You Rock My World".

In 2004, GrooveWorx began creating custom cues for television shows such as Extreme Makeover, Extreme Makeover: Home Edition, Deal or No Deal and Supernanny. GrooveWorx also embedded itself into the realm of feature film advertising with the release of the Full Tilt, Volume 1 music collection, which became an instantaneous hit. Full Tilt, Volume 1 was followed up by Full Tilt, Volumes 2 and 3 and Full Tilt Trailer Tools 1 & 2, additional collections of trailer music compositions used in hundreds of major Hollywood feature films.

In October 2006, GrooveWorx collaborated with composer/drummer Stewart Copeland of the Police to create Eardrum, a collection of film trailer music that was exclusively created for GrooveWorx. In 2007 GrooveWorx released Full Tilt, Volume 3, the most ambitious project to date and will be working on a follow-up to Eardrum, as well as work with new composers to further round out their film trailer collections. Other notable composers that have collaborated with GrooveWorx are Danny Elfman, David Newman and Rachel Portman.

Full Tilt Rising has since been released. Yet another album by the name of Glory, Oath and Blood quickly followed. GrooveWorx produced the background track for the movie trailers  Robin Hood, Avatar, Percy Jackson & the Olympians: The Lightning Thief, Prince of Persia, Jennifer's Body, X-Men Origins: Wolverine, Inception and The Wolfman. Full Tilt Convergence is the latest album released by GrooveWorx.

In 2012, Full Tilt End Game was released for advertising clients.

GrooveWorx worked on the musical score to StarCraft II: Wings of Liberty''''.

 GrooveWorx and beyond 

In March 2010, the Groove Addicts Music Library was sold to Warner Chappell Music and the owner of Groove Addicts, Dain Blair rebranded the remaining company as GrooveWorx. In 2012. GrooveWorx continues to score commercials, TV shows, radio imaging and feature film trailers.

In the summer of 2013, GrooveWorx released their first new trailer industry release since their sale to Warner Music Group, entitled "Rogue" by feature film composers Atli Orvarsson and David Fleming. The album combined orchestrated melodies with heavy sound design in combination with high-intensity hits. Since then, the company have continued to release many more albums, including "Abbattoir" by feature film composer Tyler Bates (300 and Watchmen'').

In December 2015, GrooveWorx collaborated with composer Thomas Vo for an industry release, entitled "Ashes Fall." Featuring hybrid elements with emphasis on orchestral melodies, the genre of the album was geared towards gradual and dramatic builds. Two of the more successful collaborations on trailer music have been with sound designers Robert Dudzic under a series called "RAID" and Kathie Talbot with "FETISH ASSAULT".

See also 
 Trailer music  Recent movie trailers containing music from GrooveWorx include "The Last OG", "Greyhound with Tom Hanks", "Bloodshot with Vin Diesel", "Hunters with Al Pacino", "Fantasy Island", "The Outsider", "1917", "Top Gun 2020", "Ford v Ferrari", "Hobbs & Shaw", "Pet Sematary", "Aquaman", "First Man", "Bohemian Rhapsody", "Justice League", "The Equalizer II".

References

External links

Groove Addicts' Trailer Music
GrooveWorx Trailer Music
Trailer Music News

Music production companies
Production music
Companies established in 1996
Companies based in Los Angeles